Georges Neurouth (24 September 1881 – 6 September 1914) was a French cyclist. He competed at the 1900 Summer Olympics in the men's sprint. He did not finish in the third heat of the first round.

Personal life
Neurouth served as a lieutenant in the 246th Infantry Regiment of the French Army during the First World War. He was killed in action in Seine-et-Marne on 6 September 1914.

References

1881 births
1914 deaths
Olympic cyclists of France
French male cyclists
Cyclists at the 1900 Summer Olympics
Cyclists from Paris
French military personnel killed in World War I
French Army officers